Ahmad Samsuri bin Mokhtar (born 15 November 1970) is a Malaysian politician who has served as the 15th Menteri Besar of Terengganu and Member of the Terengganu State Legislative Assembly (MLA) for Ru Rendang since May 2018. He is a member and has served as Vice-President of the Malaysian Islamic Party (PAS), a component party of the Perikatan Nasional (PN) coalition since June 2019.

Education 
PhD (Aeroengine Ignition and Combustion, High Altitude Engine Failure), School of Mechanical Engineering, University of Leeds, UK (2001)
Masters of Science in Combustion and Energy, Centre for Combustion Studies, University of Leeds, UK (1996)
BEng (Hons) in Mechanical and Materials Engineering, Universiti Kebangsaan Malaysia, Malaysia (1993)
Sekolah Menengah Sains Sultan Mahmud, Kuala Terengganu (1983–1988)

Menteri Besar of Terengganu 
When the Menteri Besar and 10 executive councillors (EXCO) was scheduled to be sworn-in before the Sultan of Terengganu, Mizan Zainal Abidin, PAS' Terengganu state commissioner Husein Awang declined to name the incoming Menteri Besar and EXCO members. On the contrary, he remarked that the media would find out after the swearing-in ceremony which could take up to two hours. Earlier it was reported that PAS had submitted three names as candidates to be appointed as the Menteri Besar including Samsuri. The rumours of Samsuri Mokhtar's name, who was political secretary to PAS president, Abdul Hadi Awang since 2008, being one of the names submitted had been raging among the party's leadership. Samsuri, who is also a former Universiti Putra Malaysia (UPM) lecturer and selected aerospace specialist, being selected amongst the candidates for Menteri Besar is part of the party's efforts to showcase new leadership generation in the state by mobilizing technocrats and scholars. He succeeded Ahmad Razif Abdul Rahman as Menteri Besar after PAS won a two-thirds majority in the Terengganu State Legislative Assembly in the 2018 Terengganu state election, which enabled PAS to form the state government.

Election results

Honours
  :
  Knight Grand Companion of the Order of Sultan Mizan Zainal Abidin of Terengganu (SSMZ) – Dato' Seri (2019)

References 

1970 births
Living people
People from Terengganu
Malaysian educators
Malaysian people of Malay descent
Malaysian Muslims
Malaysian engineers
Malaysian Islamic Party politicians
Members of the Terengganu State Legislative Assembly
Terengganu state executive councillors
Chief Ministers of Terengganu
21st-century Malaysian politicians